Gattu Ramachandra Rao is an Indian politician part of Telangana Rashtra Samithi, and was earlier with YSR Congress Party, Praja Rajyam Party and Communist Party of India (Marxist).

Career
Gattu Ramachandra Rao was a leader in CPI(M). He rebelled against the CPI(M) State leadership in 2008 owing to the style of functioning of certain leaders. He briefly joined Praja Rajyam Party before joining Congress party. He has joined YSR Congress party after its formation. He is the editor of Samajika Nyayam, a Telugu language magazine. He was an official spokesperson of YSR Congress Party & also the State Convener for BC Wing. He recently joined TRS as he felt that there was no future for YSRCP in Telangana.

References

Telangana politicians
Telugu politicians
Living people
Praja Rajyam Party politicians
Communist Party of India (Marxist) politicians from Telangana
Telangana Rashtra Samithi politicians
YSR Congress Party politicians
Year of birth missing (living people)